Dajti Mountain National Park is a national park established in 1966 in central Albania, spanning an area of  since 2006. The area is under shared jurisdiction between Albanian Agency of Protected Areas (AKZM) and Tirana Municipality Parks and Recreation Agency (APR). It is adjacent to Shtamë Pass National Park to the northwest, Kraste-Verjon Protected Landscape to the west, and Mali me Gropa-Bizë-Martanesh Protected Landscape to the east. The park is marked by an extremely fragmented, rugged topography which creates favourable conditions for a great diversity of ecosystems and biodiversity.

The International Union for Conservation of Nature  (IUCN) has listed the park as Category II. The park has been recognised as an Important Plant Area of international importance by Plantlife.

In 2019, the new Dajti Mt National Park tourist information centre was opened, located near the TV and Radio towers along SH47 road in Fushe Dajt.

The area is known for Dajti Ekspres Cable Car and Adventure Park in addition to the area’s long standing traditional restaurants serving local dishes according to the slow food tradition.

Geology
Climbers of the mountain can view down into the city of Tirana and over the mountains of the region. Due to the panoramic view, this place has been named as the Balcony of Tirana. One of Tirana's main water sources, Lake Bovilla, is located to the northeast of Brar with steep cliffs and a canyon. On the other extremity of the park along Erzen River is found the prehistoric Pellumbas Cave located in the Skorana Gorge, which has been formed by the river. Another natural attraction is the Shëngjini Waterfalls located near Shëngjergj village.

Flora and Fauna

Dajti's varied geology and topography have resulted in a variety of flora and fauna. In addition to the forests and mountain landscapes with many wild flowers, numerous mammals are protected as well. The park is inhabited by wild boar, Eurasian wolf, red fox, European hare, brown bear, squirrel, and European wildcat. In the lower part of the mountains, the vegetation consists of scrubland and heath, myrtle and fragaria. Oak dominates at around 600-1,000 m altitude interspersed with beech and maple forests and some conifers above 1,000 m altitude. The rocky top has little vegetation.

Forest fires and deforestation
In the 2010s, deforestation has become a major problem on the mountain. In the summer of 2012 and spring 2019, forest fires burned down 10 ha of forests at the Priska summit and partially Dajti in 2017, requiring authorities to extinguish it only with the help of helicopters. The damage was extensive at the summits and can be clearly seen from Tirana.

Forest fires are happening more frequently every year, while those responsible are not being convicted.

See also  
 Geography of Albania
 Protected areas of Albania
 Dajti Mountain

References

External links
Dajti National Park on AKZM.net National Parks Portal

 

 
National parks of Albania
Protected areas established in 1966
Protected areas of Tirana County
1966 establishments in Albania
Forests of Albania